The Wren 460 is a STOL conversion of a Cessna 180 or 182 airframe.

Design and development 
The Wren 460 traces its history to the Skyshark, a modification of the earlier Robertson Skylark SRX-1, built by James Robertson, son of Robertson Aircraft Corporation founder William B. Robertson, in the late 1950s.  The Skyshark incorporated a number of modifications, most notably a canard fitted with elevators in the slipstream behind the propeller.  It was a technological success but too expensive to produce.  

Robertson incorporated many features of the Skyshark into the Wren Aircraft Company's Wren 460.  A conversion of the Cessna 180 or 182 airframe, the Wren 460 featured full-span double-slotted flaps, movable spoilers to assist the ailerons with roll control, and an optional reversible pitch propeller for shorter landing runs.  Like the Skyshark, the Wren 460 also featured a set of canards immediately behind the propeller, taking advantage of the propeller's airstream and allowing the nose to pitch up even when the aircraft is motionless.  The stall angle of the airfoil was also changed from 16 to 20 degrees by the addition of a drooped leading edge cuff, a modification that would later be incorporated in the standard 182.

Operational history 
The Wren 460, modified from a Cessna 182A, made its first flight in January 1963, and received FAA certification on June 30, 1964.

Pilots praised the Wren 460 for its STOL performance.  Kevin Brown of Popular Mechanics noting that it "lands like a carrier plane", but also noted that such a touchdown was "quite hard".  Despite the publicity of its initial release, few were built due in part to its price, which was over twice that of a stock Cessna 182 at the time.  Wren Aircraft eventually went bankrupt in 1969 after the United States military rejected its projects.

The type certificate of the Wren 460 was sold to Galen Means, and was again sold to Todd Peterson in 1977.  Peterson, the owner of Advanced Lift Systems (later Peterson's Performance Plus), began production of the Wren 460 once again as the Wren 460P, this time modified from used 182 airframes of newer models as opposed to the new, early model airframes of the original.  Unlike the original, the Wren 460P did not have the option of a reversible propeller as Peterson believed it offered too little benefit for its cost.  By 1986, a Wren 460P cost less than a new 182 by almost $20,000.

Variants 
Wren 460
Original conversions by Wren Aircraft Company.  About 200 modified from new Cessna 180 and 182 airframes.
Wren 460 Beta
Wren 460 with optional reversible propeller.
Wren 460G
Designation of aircraft converted from 182G airframes.
Wren 460H
Designation of aircraft converted from new 182H airframes.  Certified June 1965.
Wren 460P
Conversions by Advanced Lift Systems (later Peterson's Performance Plus).  Modified from used 182H through 182M airframes, no option for reversible propeller.
Wren 460QB
"Quiet Bird".  Modified Wren 460B to compete with the Lockheed YO-3 Quiet Star.  Speculated to have been a candidate for the ZO-4A designation, with the United States Air Force proposing to buy 28 aircraft before the O-4 program was canceled in 1970.
Peterson 260SE
Simplified conversion with stock wings and a 260 hp Continental IO-470-F engine.  Over 500 converted.
Peterson 230SE
Further simplified conversion with only the canard modification.
Super Skylane
Non-STOL conversion of the 182 with the 260 hp IO-470-F.
Bushmaster
Version of the 260SE with strengthened landing gear and large tires, intended for bush flying.
Katmai
Peterson 260 SE with lengthened wings.
King Katmai
Katmai with a 300 hp Continental IO-550 engine.
Kenai
King Katmai with stock 182 wings.

Specifications (Wren 460)

References

Notes

Bibliography
 Taylor, John W. R. Jane's All The World's Aircraft 1988-89. Coulsdon, UK:Jane's Defence Data, 1988. .
 Brown, K.; "Takeoff at 30: Cockpit test of new toothwing plane", Popular mechanics, September 1963, Pages 94–97,203-206. (retrieved 6 October 2014).

External links
Manufacturer's website
Photo galleries Peterson 230/260SEs and Wren 460s
Wren 460 picture Spoilers, full-wing double-slotted flaps and canard clearly visible.
Wren 460
FlightGlobal.com

1980s United States civil utility aircraft
Canard aircraft
High-wing aircraft
Single-engined tractor aircraft
Aircraft first flown in 1963